Raimi is a surname. Notable people with the surname include:

 The Raimi brothers
 Ivan Raimi, a doctor (eldest)
 Sam Raimi, a filmmaker (middle)
 Ted Raimi, an actor (youngest)
 Ali Yahya Mahdi Al Raimi, an underage prisoner

Fictional characters:
 Worm Raimi, character in the manga and anime series Saint Seiya